The 2009 Big Ten men's basketball tournament was played between March 12 and March 15, 2009 at Conseco Fieldhouse in Indianapolis, Indiana. It was the twelfth annual Big Ten men's basketball tournament. The championship was won by Purdue who defeated Ohio State in the championship game. As a result, Purdue received the Big Ten's automatic bid to the NCAA tournament. The win marked Purdue's first tournament championship in only their second appearance.

Seeds
All Big Ten schools played in the tournament. Teams were seeded by conference record, with a tiebreaker system used to seed teams with identical conference records. Seeding for the tournament was determined at the close of the regular conference season. The top five teams received a first round bye.

Schedule

Bracket

Source

Honors

All-Tournament Team
Robbie Hummel, Purdue – Big Ten tournament Most Outstanding Player
Mike Davis, Illinois
Evan Turner, Ohio State
JaJuan Johnson, Purdue
E'Twaun Moore, Purdue

References

External links
Official website

Big Ten men's basketball tournament
Tournament
Big Ten Conference men's basketball tournament
Big Ten men's basketball tournament
Big Ten